The 2012 German Open Grand Prix Gold was the first grand prix gold and grand prix tournament of the 2012 BWF Grand Prix Gold and Grand Prix. The tournament was held in RWE-Sporthalle, Mulheim an der Ruhr, Germany from February 28 until March 4, 2012 and had a total purse of $125,000.

Men's singles

Seeds

  Lin Dan (champion)
  Chen Jin (third round)
  Sho Sasaki (third round)
  Lee Hyun-Il (third round)
  Simon Santoso (final)
  Jan Ø. Jørgensen (semi-final)
  Marc Zwiebler (third round)
  Wang Zhengming (first round)
  Tommy Sugiarto (semi-final)
  Hans-Kristian Vittinghus (quarter-final)
  Shon Wan-Ho (quarter-final)
  Boonsak Ponsana (second round)
  Wong Wing Ki (quarter-final)
  Pablo Abian (third round)
  Rajiv Ouseph (withdrew)
  Dionysius Hayom Rumbaka (third round)

Finals

Top half

Section 1

Section 2

Section 3

Section 4

Bottom half

Section 5

Section 6

Section 7

Section 8

Women's singles

Seeds

  Wang Xin (semi-final)
  Li Xuerui (champion)
  Juliane Schenk (final)
  Cheng Shao-Chieh (first round)
  Sung Ji-Hyun (quarter-final)
  Bae Youn-Joo (first round)
  Ratchanok Inthanon (quarter-final)
  Porntip Buranaprasertsuk (second round)

Finals

Top half

Section 1

Section 2

Bottom half

Section 3

Section 4

Men's doubles

Seeds

  Jung Jae-Sung / Lee Yong-Dae (final)
  Ko Sung-Hyun / Yoo Yeon-Seong (semi-final)
  Chai Biao / Guo Zhendong (first round)
  Mohammad Ahsan / Bona Septano (second round)
  Hirokatsu Hashimoto / Noriyasu Hirata (quarter-final)
  Alvent Yulianto / Hendra Aprida Gunawan (second round)
  Markis Kido / Hendra Setiawan (quarter-final)
  Fang Chieh-Min / Lee Sheng-Mu (first round)

Finals

Top half

Section 1

Section 2

Bottom half

Section 3

Section 4

Women's doubles

Seeds

  Ha Jung-Eun / Kim Min-Jung (first round)
  Mizuki Fujii / Reika Kakiiwa (semi-final)
  Miyuki Maeda / Satoko Suetsuna (quarter-final)
  Shizuka Matsuo / Mami Naito (second round)
  Cheng Wen-Hsing / Chien Yu-Chin (quarter-final)
  Meiliana Jauhari / Greysia Polii (second round)
  Jung Kyung-Eun / Kim Ha-Na (final)
  Xia Huan / Tang Jinhua (champion)

Finals

Top half

Section 1

Section 2

Bottom half

Section 3

Section 4

Mixed doubles

Seeds

  Chen Hung-Ling / Cheng Wen-Hsing (second round)
  Sudket Prapakamol / Saralee Thoungthongkam (semi-final)
  Lee Yong-Dae / Ha Jung-Eun (final)
  Thomas Laybourn / Kamilla Rytter Juhl (champion)
  Chan Peng Soon / Goh Liu Ying (first round)
  Shintaro Ikeda / Reiko Shiota (second round)
  Songphon Anugritayawon / Kunchala Voravichitchaikul (second round)
  Michael Fuchs / Birgit Michels (quarter-final)

Finals

Top half

Section 1

Section 2

Bottom half

Section 3

Section 4

References

German Open (badminton)
German Open
Open
Sport in Mülheim
BWF Grand Prix Gold and Grand Prix